István Mestyán; born 31 Mart 1989 in Dunaújváros) is a Hungarian professional ice hockey defenceman who plays for DEAC in the Erste Liga.

External links

1989 births
Living people
Dunaújvárosi Acélbikák players
Ferencvárosi TC (ice hockey) players
Hungarian ice hockey defencemen
MAC Budapest players
Sportspeople from Dunaújváros